Ian Cooper (born 14 August 1970) is an Australian violinist. He was commissioned to compose and perform the "Tin Symphony" for the opening ceremony of the Games of the XXVII Olympiad in Sydney. The event was televised worldwide with an estimated 2.85 billion viewers. He performs many musical styles including Classical, Gypsy, Jazz, Irish & Country music and has appeared with Tommy Emmanuel, James Morrison, Olivia Newton-John, Barry White, Simon Tedeschi, Deni Hines, and Silverchair.

Background
Cooper began learning the violin at age 4 from his mother Jan Cooper, a Suzuki Violin teacher. He performed the Seitz Violin Concerto No. 2 Allegro Moderato at age 6 on the Seven Network's 11AM program with Roger Climpson. At age 7, Cooper performed concerts in the US and Canada, representing Australia at the Suzuki Violin World Conference. At age 8, he was awarded a scholarship to the New South Wales Conservatorium of Music in Sydney where he studied with Christopher Kimber, Harry Curby, and Laslo Kiss. He was subsequently awarded a music scholarship to Knox Grammar School where he also studied drums and percussion. At age 10, a performance in Japan was broadcast on NHK Television.

In 1990, Cooper was mentored by the French Jazz Violinist Stéphane Grappelli. After performing with the guitarist Tommy Emmanuel at his invitation at the Sydney Opera House in 1992, Cooper joined Emmanuel on tour until 1997. Cooper has also been a member of trumpeter James Morrison's sextet since 2007.

Instruments
Cooper's main performing violin was made by E.H. Roth in Markneukirchen, Germany in 1926 and is modelled on an Antonio Stradivari 1714 Cremona instrument. His preferred violin for recording was made by Glanville & Co. in Sydney and is based on a Guarneri violin. His electric violins are Epoch, David Guscott  and E.F. Keebler.

Discography
 1993 – Soundpost – with Ike Isaacs, Peter Inglis & Tim Rollinson
 1994 – Strings of Swing – with Don Burrows, Tom Baker & Ian Date
 1994 – Royal Flush – with Bernard Berkhout and Ian Date
 1994 – Marcia Hines - Right Here and Now
 1994 – Max Sharam - Coma
 1994 – Chocolate Starfish - Box
 1995 – Ian's World – with Tom Baker, Ian Date, Bernard Berkhout & John Morrison
 1995 – The Backsliders - Wide Open 
 1995 – Tim Rogers & You Am I - Jewels & Bullets CD Single
 1995 – 25th Breda Jazz Festival Official CD with Fapy Lafertin & Ian Date 
 1995 – Max Sharam - A Million Year Girl
 1996 – Annie Crummer - Seventh Wave
 1996 – Silverchair - Freak Show
 1996 – At Home – with David Paquette
 1997 – Hard Axe to Follow – with Tommy Emmanuel, Tommy Tycho, George Golla & Ian Date
 1997 – The Nissan Cedrics - Going for a Song
 1997 – The Earthmen - Love Walked In
 1997 – John Morrison - Swingin' Upstairs
 1999 – The Backsliders - Poverty Deluxe
 2000 – The Games of the XXVII Olympiad 2000: Music from the Opening Ceremony CD & DVD
 2002 – Big Band – with James Morrison
 2002 – Geoff Achison - Chasing My Tail
 2005 – John Farnham - I Remember When I Was Young: Songs from the Great Australian Songbook
 2007 – Simon Tedeschi & Ian Cooper – with Simon Tedeschi
 2007 – Deni Hines & James Morrison - The Other Woman
 2008 – Melinda Schneider - Be Yourself
 2008 – Olivia Newton-John - A Celebration in Song
 2008 – Deni Hines & James Morrison - The Other Woman – Live DVD
 2008 – Melinda Schneider - Hits & Rarities
 2009 – The Smokin' Crawdads - Straight to the Pool Room
 2009 – Ballads and Bossa Nova with James Morrison, Emma Pask, Jim Pennell, Steve Brien, Paul Cutlan & Phil Stack
 2009 – Quintet with Simon Tedeschi & James Morrison
 2010 – The Idea of North & James Morrison - Feels Like Spring
 2010 – Hoodoo Gurus - Purity of Essence
 2011 – Melinda Schneider - Life Begins at 40
 2012 – The Idea of North - This Christmas
 2013 – Nathan Leigh Jones - I'll Be Home for Christmas
 2014 – Richard Ingham - A Return to Home
 2015 – Just Passing Through – with Tommy Emmanuel and Ian Date
 2015 – Emma Pask - Cosita Divina
 2015 – Mayhem 101 - Six Stars & the Union Jack
 2015 – Richard Ingham - Almost Wordless
 2016 – Melinda Schneider - Melinda Does Doris Again
 2020 – Qantas Airways - Qantas In-Flight Safety Video
 2020 – Husky - Go Don't Stop
 2022 – Cats in Space - Kickstart the Sun

Awards and recognition

Ace Awards
 (wins only)
|-
| 1999
| Ian Cooper 
| Instrumental Act of the Year 
| 
|-
| 2000
| Ian Cooper 
| Instrumental Act of the Year 
| 
|-
| 2016
| Ian Cooper 
| Instrumental Act of the Year 
| 
|-

Golden Fiddle Awards
 (wins only)
|-
| 2005
| Ian Cooper 
| Best CD by a fiddler as soloist 
| 
|-
|rowspan="2"| 2006
| Ian Cooper 
| Best fiddler soloist
| 
|-
| Ian Cooper - Big Band
| Best CD by a fiddler as soloist
| 
|-
|rowspan="2"| 2014
| Ian Cooper 
| Best fiddler as a soloist
| 
|-
| Ian Cooper's International Spectacular
| Best Band 
| 
|-

Mo Awards
The Australian Entertainment Mo Awards (commonly known informally as the Mo Awards), were annual Australian entertainment industry awards. They recognise achievements in live entertainment in Australia from 1975 to 2016. Ian Cooper won two awards in that time
 (wins only)
|-
| 1998
| Ian Cooper 
| Instrumental Performer of the Year 
| 
|-
| 1999
| Ian Cooper 
| Instrumental Performer of the Year 
| 
|-

See also 
 List of jazz violinists

References

1970 births
Living people
Sydney Conservatorium of Music alumni
Australian jazz musicians
Australian violinists
Male violinists
Australian male composers
Australian composers
Musicians from Sydney
21st-century violinists
21st-century Australian male musicians
21st-century Australian musicians
Male jazz musicians